The Marlin Model 70P, also known as the Marlin Papoose, is a .22 Long Rifle semi-automatic rifle manufactured by Marlin Firearms. Disassembly requires loosening a barrel retention nut by hand or with a supplied tool. It is designed as a hiker and camper utility rifle, and appeals to the same market as the AR-7. The Model 70P is based on the earlier Marlin Model 70 (currently listed as Model 795) that has a fixed barrel and conventional stock. Its semi-automatic action originated with the Marlin Model 60. The Marlin Model 70PSS variant has a synthetic stock and stainless steel barrel.

The rifle has an open rear sight and ramp front sight with high visibility orange post surrounded by a cutaway hood. The receiver has an integral .22 tip-off scope mounting rail. Swivel studs for a carrying strap are embedded in the synthetic stock. Included Marlin accessories are a 7-round metal magazine, a tool for adjusting the barrel nut, and a padded nylon carrying case designed to float in water. Optional accessories from Marlin include 7 and 10-round nickel plated metal magazines. 25-round magazines are available.

Gallery

References
 Marlin Model 70PSS page at Marlin Firearms
 Marlin Model 70PSS Owner's Manual

.22 LR semi-automatic rifles
Marlin Firearms Company firearms
Rifles of the United States
Survival guns
Takedown guns